The Drama uprising was an uprising of the population of the northern Greek city of Drama and the surrounding villages on 28–29 September 1941 against the  Bulgarian  occupation regime. The revolt lacked organization or military resources; the Bulgarian Army swiftly suppressed it, with massive reprisals. The revolt had guidance from the Communist Party of Greece (KKE).

Background

The April 1941 German-led invasion of Greece was launched partly from Bulgaria, and on 20 April, just prior to the Greek surrender, I Corps of the Bulgarian Army crossed into Greece and occupied almost the whole of the northeastern part of the country east of the Strymon River. The Greek regions occupied by Bulgaria comprised: eastern Macedonia, including the provinces of Serrai (now known as Serres) and Drama; and western Thrace, including the provinces of Cavalla (now known as Kavala) and Rhodope, and the island of Samothrace. While Samothrace was occupied by Bulgaria, the remainder of the Evros prefecture, at the land border with Turkey, was occupied by the Germans to avoid any potential confrontation between Bulgaria and Turkey. Unlike Germany and Italy in their respective occupation zones, Bulgaria officially annexed the occupied territories on 14 May 1941; they had long been a target of Bulgarian irredentism.

The occupied territories became part of Bulgaria from an administrative perspective, and were named the Province of Aegean (sometimes referred to as ). However, the Germans considered the Bulgarian annexation "provisional" until a peace treaty was signed at the end of the war, retained control over mining and industrial concerns within the Bulgarian-occupied area, and also had extensive influence over military, political and economic matters within its boundaries. The uncertainty regarding the future of the Bulgarian-occupied territories exacerbated concerns among the population and between the Axis powers occupying parts of Greece regarding their future.  

For the first few months, the Bulgarian occupation authorities attempted to gain the support of the local population, deploying a substantial propaganda campaign, establishing Bulgarian schools, and giving food and milk to Greek children. They quickly realised that this approach would bear no fruit, and instead implemented drastic measures to Bulgarise the occupied territories. In eastern Macedonia, the occupiers made efforts to gain the support of Slavic Macedonians, and encourage in them an identification with a Bulgarian national identity. This campaign was partly effective, and some of the Slavic Macedonians in the region welcomed the Bulgarians as liberators. At the time of the Bulgarian occupation of eastern Macedonia, most of the Slavic Macedonians in the Macedonian region, which included parts of Greece, Yugoslavia, Bulgaria and Albania, had strong pro-Bulgarian sentiments. The Bulgarisation campaign in the occupied territories saw all Greek public officials at almost every level deported. A ban was placed on the use of the Greek language, and the names of towns and places changed to the forms traditional in the Bulgarian language. In addition, the Bulgarian government tried to alter the ethnic composition of the region, by expropriating land and houses from Greeks in favor of Bulgarian settlers, and by the introduction of forced labor and of economic restrictions for the Greeks in an effort to force them to migrate.

Tsar Boris III personally visited the annexed areas on 28–30 April, and gave speeches in order to reassure the local Greek and Slavic population.

As of summer 1941 with the appearance of the first communist Partisans groups, they appealed towards the Macedonian Slavs to join the resistance. With the capitulation of Italy in 1943 and the Soviet victories over Nazi Germany more Slavic Macedonians, began to support the resistance forces led by Communist Party of Greece (KKE).

Prelude
Immediately before the uprising, the activity of the teacher Thanasis Genios from the village of Irakleia was noticed, who later became known as the commissioner of the 11th division of ELAS under the name "Lasanis". In August 1941, he appeared as the leader of a partisan detachment "Odysseus Andruzos", in Mount Kerdilia. While in Kilkis, another group appeared under the name "Athanasios Diakos". The "Odysseus Andruzos" detachment carried out sabotage attacks on police stations in the villages of Efkarpia and Mavrotalasa. A second major operation was carried out on September 22 1941, when a German convoy was attacked near the town of Lachanas. This was followed by a strong response from the German forces, due to which the detachments almost disbanded.

Their restoration took place almost in parallel with the occupation of this territory. Thus, at the initiative of Apostolos Tzanis, Paraskevas Drakos, Arampatzis and Lambros Mazarakis, the brothers Petros and Argyris Krokos, Petros Pastourmatzis, Gjorgji Bonchev, Nikolaidis, Atanas Karamurogi and others. The CPG Drama Committee will soon start publishing and distributing the illegal newspaper "Neos Dromos" in Greek, while leaflets have occasionally been published in Macedonian Slavic as well.

On August 20, 1941, the speech of Petros Pastourmatzis (nom de guerre: Kitsos), was recorded at the first plenum of the Communist Party of Greece - District Committee for Drama region, where he informed that a headquarters was already formed which needed fighters who did not have families on their own. According to the testimony of one of the participants in this uprising, Gjorgji Bonchev, from the partisan headquarters on Mount Makros, an order was given to launch attacks on the municipality buildings, police stations and army objects in order to paralyze the occupier. The date set for the start of these actions was the night between September 28 and 29, 1941 at 23:00.

Uprising
In this situation, a revolt broke out on 28 September 1941 under the guidance of the Communist Party of Greece. The uprising initially broke out in Doxato, where local Greeks attacked the police station and killed six or seven Bulgarian policemen. In another village, Choristi, a second group was recruited and moved to the mountains.

Parallel to the events in Doxato, the group from Prosotsani attacked the municipality with 9 fighters, the police division with 20 fighters, while the army garrison with the rest 18 fighters. Next morning of September 29, in the town of Prosotsani, a people's government was declared. Gjorgji Bonchev addressed this rally in local Slavic, while the proclamation for the uprising in Greek was read by Antonios Nikolaidis.

Reprisals

The uprising was brutally suppressed by the Bulgarian occupation authorities. The following day, 29 September, all leaders were either killed in battle or in their attempt to escape to the German occupation zone. However, Bulgarian retaliations were not limited to the rebels. Bulgarian troops moved into Drama and the other rebellious cities to suppress the uprising and seized all men between 18 and 45. They were reported to have executed between 360 and 500 people in Drama alone. According to the Bulgarian military reports, up to 1,600 Greeks were killed in the uprising and in the weeks that followed - but Greek sources claim thousands of civilian casualties. Most of the members of the Communist Party of Greece were slaughtered by the Bulgarians, except for one member. In the villages of Doxato and Choristi a total of 485 men were executed оn September 29.

The main commanders and actors of these massacres are the Bulgarian and military persons, Colonel Mihailov, Major Pecev, as well as the Commander of the Police, Stefan Magelanski.

The massacres precipitated an exodus of Greeks from the Bulgarian into the German occupation zone in Central Macedonia. Bulgarian reprisals continued after the suppression of the uprising, adding to the torrent of refugees. Villages were destroyed for sheltering “partisans” who were in fact only the survivors of villages previously destroyed.  The terror and famine became so severe that the Athens government considered plans for evacuating the entire population to German-occupied Greece.

References

Sources
 
 
 
 
 
 
 
 

 
 

Conflicts in 1941
1941 in Greece
1941 in Bulgaria
Bulgarian occupation of Greece during World War II
Greek Macedonia in World War II
History of Drama, Greece
Uprisings during World War II
Battles and operations involving the Greek Resistance
Massacres in Greece during World War II
Massacres of men
Violence against men in Europe
Mass murder in 1941
September 1941 events